Culex (Oculeomyia) bitaeniorhynchus is a species of mosquito belonging to the genus Culex. It is a cosmopolitan species which can be found in all continents, except America and Antarctica.

Bionomics
Larva can be found in pools with stagnant waters containing Spirogyra. Females are blood feeders of birds and sometimes humans. Adults and larva can be naturally infected with Wuchereria bancrofti and Batai virus in India, and Burgia malayi in Sri Lanka. It can also infect Murray Valley encephalitis in Australia.

References

External links
The Forms of Culex (Culex) bitaeniorhynchus Giles in Southeast Asia
Semiochemicals of Culex bitaeniorhynchus

bitaeniorhynchus
Insects described in 1901